Hugh Powell Crosby (January 29, 1829 – January 8, 1905) was an Ontario political figure. He represented York East in the Legislative Assembly of Ontario as a Liberal member from 1867 to 1874.

He was born in Markham in Upper Canada in 1829 to Chauncey Crosby and Polly Detweiler (Miller) Crosby and educated there. He served as clerk and treasurer of Markham for 10 years. He was also captain in the local militia. He married Harriet N. White (1934 - 1908). They had a daughter Mary Gertrude Crosby (1869–1941) who married John Crosby Jenkins.

References
 Picture source: Library and Archives Canada

External links
 
The Canadian parliamentary companion and annual register, 1871, HJ Morgan

1829 births
Ontario Liberal Party MPPs
1905 deaths